Cyathodes petiolaris  is a small alpine plant in the family Ericaceae, found in Tasmania, Australia.

References

Epacridoideae
Flora of Tasmania
Taxa named by Augustin Pyramus de Candolle
Taxa named by George Claridge Druce